In Their Footsteps is a ten-part documentary depicting Australian families and war. The first episode aired in Australia on 8 May 2011 on the Nine Network. In each episode an Australian will retrace the steps of a close ancestor's wartime experience.

Series One (2011)

External links 
Official website
The Age
Australian History Research

Nine Network original programming
2010s Australian documentary television series
2011 Australian television series debuts
2011 Australian television series endings
English-language television shows